Among Rogo Sports Hall is a multifunction sports arena in Semaki, Umbulharjo, Yogyakarta, Special Region of Yogyakarta, Indonesia. This arena can be used for basketball, badminton, volleyball, futsal, and taekwondo venues.

Notable international sporting events 
Yonex Sunrise Indonesia Open 2013
2017 BWF World Junior Championships
Kapal Api Indonesia International Series 2022
Mansion Sport Indonesia International Challenge 2022

References 

Buildings and structures in Yogyakarta
Basketball venues in Indonesia
Badminton venues